Eleven ships of the British Royal Navy have been named HMS Kent, after the county of Kent and the Duke of Kent.

  was a 46-gun fourth rate launched in 1652 as the Kentish Frigate, renamed Kent in 1660, and wrecked in 1672.
  was a 70-gun third rate launched in 1679, rebuilt in 1699 and 1724, and broken up in 1744.
  was a 70-gun third rate launched in 1746 and hulked in 1760.
  was a 74-gun third rate launched in 1762 and sold in 1784.
  was a 74-gun third rate launched in 1798, converted to a sheer hulk in 1856, and broken up in 1881.
 HMS Kent (1798) was a 16-gun gunvessel purchased in 1798 and sold in 1801.
 HMS Kent was to have been a 91-gun second rate. She was laid down in 1860 but was cancelled in 1863.
 HMS Kent was originally the 98-gun second rate . She was renamed HMS Kent in 1888 and then HMS Caledonia in 1891, before being broken up in 1906.
  was a  armoured cruiser launched in 1901 and sold in 1920.
  was a  heavy cruiser launched in 1926 and sold in 1948.
  was a  guided missile destroyer launched in 1961 and sold in 1997 for breaking up.
  is a Type 23 frigate launched in 1998 and currently in service.

Battle honours 

1653 Portland1
1654 Gabbard1 
1655 Porto Farina
1665 Lowestoft
1666 Orfordness
1692 Barfleur
1702 Vigo
1703 Velez Malaga
1718 Cape Passero
1747 Ushant
1801 Egypt
1914 Falkland Islands 
1940 Atlantic
1940 Mediterranean
1942 - 43 Arctic
1944 Norway

1: As the Kentish Frigate

See also
 
 
 
 Hired armed cutter 
 

Royal Navy ship names